Lasko Andonovski (born 15 June 1991) is a Macedonian handball player who plays for RK Tineks Prolet and for the North Macedonia men's national handball team.

References

Macedonian male handball players
1991 births
Living people
People from Resen, North Macedonia
Mediterranean Games competitors for North Macedonia
Competitors at the 2018 Mediterranean Games